Neosilurus novaeguineae is a freshwater eeltail catfish described by Max Weber in 1907. It is endemic to New Guinea and occurs in both Indonesian and Papua New Guinean parts of the island. The common name New Guinea tandan has been proposed for it.

This catfish prefers deeper pools of small streams that are often littered with logs and branches. It grows to  standard length.

References

novaeguineae
Endemic fauna of New Guinea
Freshwater fish of New Guinea
Fish of Papua New Guinea
Fish of Western New Guinea
Fish described in 1907
Taxa named by Max Carl Wilhelm Weber